Ashok Pathak is an Indian actor. He is best known for his role of Vinod in the TV series Panchayat. He began his career with film of Bittu Boss.
In 11 years of his acting journey, he has acted in films and web shows, including Bittoo Boss, Shanghai, The Field, Saat Uchakkey, A Death in the Gunj, Pakauu Class of 83, Sacred Games, Aarya (TV series), Kathmandu Connection 2 and Guns of Benaras, among many others.
Ashok and his family migrated from Bihar to Hissar, Haryana for work.

References

External links
 

Indian male film actors
Year of birth missing (living people)
Living people
Indian male television actors